Raleigh station may refer to:

Raleigh station (Amtrak), an Amtrak station in Raleigh, North Carolina.
Raleigh Union Station, a train station in Raleigh to be opened in 2018.